Geographically, the country of Iran is located in West Asia and borders the Caspian Sea, Persian Gulf, and Gulf of Oman. Topographically, it is predominantly located on the Persian Plateau. Its mountains have impacted both the political and the economic history of the country for several centuries. The mountains enclose several broad basins, on which major agricultural and urban settlements are located. Until the 20th century, when major highways and railroads were constructed through the mountains to connect the population centers, these basins tended to be relatively isolated from one another.

Typically, one major town dominated each basin, and there were complex economic relationships between the town and the hundreds of villages that surrounded it. In the higher elevations of the mountains rimming the basins, tribally organized groups practiced transhumance, moving with their herds of sheep and goats between traditionally established summer and winter pastures. There are no major river systems in the country, and historically transportation was by means of caravans that followed routes traversing gaps and passes in the mountains. The mountains also impeded easy access to the Persian Gulf and the Caspian Sea.

Iran shares its northern borders with several post-Soviet states: Armenia, Azerbaijan, and Turkmenistan. Iran's western borders are with Turkey in the north and Iraq in the south, terminating at the Arvand Rud.

The Persian Gulf and Gulf of Oman littorals form the entire  southern border. To the east lie Afghanistan on the north and Pakistan on the far south.

Topography

The topography of Iran consists of rugged, mountainous rims surrounding high interior basins. The main mountain chain is the Zagros Mountains, a series of parallel ridges interspersed with plains that bisect the country from northwest to southeast.

As the Zagros continue into southeastern Iran, the average elevation of the peaks declines dramatically to under . Rimming the Caspian Sea littoral is another chain of mountains, the narrow but high Alborz Mountains. Volcanic Mount Damavand, located in the center of the Alborz, is not only the country's highest peak but also the highest mountain on the Eurasian landmass west of the Hindu Kush.

The center of Iran consists of several closed basins that collectively are referred to as the Central Plateau. The eastern part of the plateau is covered by two salt deserts, the Dasht-e Kavir (Great Salt Desert) and the Dasht-e Lut. Except for some scattered oases, these deserts are uninhabited.

Parts of northwestern Iran are part of the Armenian highlands, which adjoins it topographically with other parts of neighbouring Turkey, Armenia, Azerbaijan, and Georgia.

Iran has only two expanses of lowlands: the Khuzestan Plain in the southwest and the Caspian Sea coastal plain in the north. Much of the Khuzestan plain is covered with marshes.

The Caspian plain is both longer and narrower. The Persian Gulf coast south of Khuzestan and the Gulf of Oman coast have no real plains because the Zagros in these areas come right down to the shore.

There are no major rivers in the country. Several other permanent rivers and streams also drain into the Persian Gulf, while a number of small rivers that originate in the northwestern Zagros or Alborz drain into the Caspian Sea.

On the Central Plateau, numerous rivers—most of which have dry beds for the greater part of the year—form from snow melting in the mountains during the spring and flow through permanent channels, draining eventually into salt lakes that also tend to dry up during the summer months. There is a permanent salt lake, Lake Urmia (the traditional name, also cited as Lake Urmiyeh, to which it has reverted after being called Lake Rezaiyeh under Mohammad Reza Shah), in the northwest, whose brine content is too high to support fish or most other forms of aquatic life. There are also several connected salt lakes along the Iran-Afghanistan border in the province of Baluchestan va Sistan.

Iran's highlands are home to some of the world's most unexpected glaciers. Their appearance in the dry environment is advantageous for those who depend on glacial ice as a supply of fresh water. In an expedition, Klaus Thymann together with the environmental charity Project Pressure produced a series of archive and expedition photographs that depict the urgency of the situation surrounding climate change and the individuals who rely on such natural ice forms to sustain life in remote areas.

A recent global remote sensing analysis suggested that there were 1,481 km² of tidal flats in Iran, making it the 22nd ranked country in terms of tidal flat area.

Climate

Iran has a variable climate. In the northwest, winters are cold with heavy snowfall and subfreezing temperatures. Spring and fall are relatively mild, while summers are dry and hot. In the south, winters are mild and the summers are very hot, having average daily temperatures in July exceeding . On the Khuzestan Plain, summer heat is accompanied by high humidity.

In general, Iran has a continental climate in which most of the relatively scant annual precipitation falls from October through April. In most of the country, yearly precipitation averages  or less. The major exceptions are the higher mountain valleys of the Zagros and the Caspian coastal plain, where precipitation averages at least  and is in the form of snow at high altitudes. In the western part of the Caspian, rainfall exceeds  annually and is distributed relatively evenly throughout the year. This contrasts with some basins of the Central Plateau that receive  or less of precipitation. Iran is considered colder than neighboring countries such as Iraq and Turkmenistan, due to its higher elevation.

Examples

Flora and fauna

7% of the country is forested. The most extensive growths are found on the mountain slopes rising from the Caspian Sea, with stands of oak, ash, elm, cypress, and other valuable trees. On the plateau proper, areas of scrub oak appear on the best-watered mountain slopes, and villagers cultivate orchards and grow the plane tree, poplar, willow, walnut, beech, maple, and mulberry. Wild plants and shrubs spring from the barren land in the spring and afford pasturage, but the summer sun burns them away. According to FAO reports, the major types of forests that exist in Iran and their respective areas are:
 Caspian forests of the northern districts – 
 Limestone mountainous forests in the northeastern districts (Juniperus forests) –  
 Pistachio forests in the eastern, southern and southeastern districts – 
 Oak forests in the central and western districts – 
 Shrubs of the Kavir (desert) districts in the central and northeastern part of the country – 
 Sub-tropical forests of the southern coast, like the Hara forests – 

Wildlife of Iran is diverse and composed of several animal species including bears, gazelles, wild pigs, wolves, jackals, panthers, Eurasian lynx, and foxes. Domestic animals include, sheep, goats, cattle, horses, water buffalo, donkeys, and camels. The pheasant, partridge, stork, eagles and falcon are also native to Iran.

As of 2001, 20 of Iran's mammal species and 14 bird species are endangered. Among them are the Baluchistan bear (Ursus thibetanus gedrosianus), a subspecies of Asian black bear, Persian fallow deer, Siberian crane, hawksbill turtle, green turtle, Oxus cobra, Latifi's viper, dugong and dolphins. The Asiatic cheetah is a critically endangered species which is extinct elsewhere and now can only be found in central to northeastern parts of Iran.

Iran lost all its Asiatic lions and Caspian tigers by the earlier part of the 20th century. The Syrian wild ass has become extinct. Syrian brown bears in the mountains, wild sheep and goats, gazelles, Persian onagers, wild pigs, Persian leopards, and foxes abound. Domestic animals include sheep, goats, cattle, horses, water buffalo, donkeys, and camels. The pheasant, partridge, stork, and falcon are native to Iran.

The Persian leopard is said to be the largest of all the subspecies of leopards in the world. The main range of this species in Iran closely overlaps with that of bezoar ibex. Hence, it is found throughout Alborz and Zagros mountain ranges, as well as smaller ranges within the Iranian plateau. The leopard population is very sparse, due to loss of habitat, loss of natural prey, and population fragmentation. Apart from bezoar ibex, wild sheep, boar, deer, (either Caspian red deer or roe deer), and domestic animals constitute leopards' diet in Iran.

Ecosystem and biosphere

Iran's bio-diversity ranks 13th in the world. There are 272 conservation areas around Iran for a total of 17 million hectares under the supervision of the Department of Environment (Iran), variously named national parks, protected areas, and natural wildlife refuges, all meant to protect the genetic resources of the country. There are only 2,617 rangers and 430 environmental monitoring units engaged in protecting these vast areas, which amounts to 6,500 hectares to cover for each ranger.

Environmental concerns

Natural hazards:
periodic droughts, floods; dust storms, sandstorms; earthquakes along western border and in the northeast

Environment – current issues:
air pollution, especially in urban areas, from vehicle emissions, refinery operations, and industrial effluents; deforestation; desertification; oil pollution in the Persian Gulf; wetland losses from drought; soil degradation (salination); inadequate supplies of potable water in some areas; water pollution from raw sewage and industrial waste; urbanization.

Resources and land use

Natural resources:
petroleum, natural gas, coal, chromium, copper, iron ore, lead, manganese, zinc, sulfur
arable land:
10.87%
permanent crops:
1.19%
other:
87.93% (2012 est.)

Irrigated land:
 (2009)

Total renewable water resources:
137 km3 (2011)

Freshwater withdrawal (domestic/industrial/agricultural):
total: 93.3 km3/yr (7%/1%/92%)
per capita: 1,306 m3/yr (2004)

Area and boundaries

Area:
total:

land:

water:

Land boundaries:
total:

border countries:
Afghanistan , Armenia , Azerbaijan-proper , Azerbaijan-Nakhchivan exclave , Iraq , Pakistan , Turkey , Turkmenistan .

Maritime boundaries:
Qatar, Saudi Arabia, United Arab Emirates, Bahrain, Kuwait, Oman

Coastline:

note:
Iran also borders the Caspian Sea, for 

Maritime claims:
territorial sea:

contiguous zone:

exclusive economic zone:
 with bilateral agreements, or median lines in the Persian Gulf
continental shelf:
natural prolongation

Elevation extremes:
lowest point: Caspian Sea 
highest point: Mount Damavand

International territorial disputes

Iran is currently engaged in international territorial disputes with several neighbouring countries.

The country protests Afghanistan's limiting flow of dammed tributaries to the Helmand River in periods of drought. The lack of a maritime boundary in the Persian Gulf with Iraq also prompts jurisdictional disputes beyond the mouth of the Arvand Rud. Iran and the United Arab Emirates have a territorial dispute over the Greater and Lesser Tunbs and Abu Musa islands, which are administered by Iran. Iran currently insists on dividing the Caspian Sea resources equally among the five littoral states, after the Russian-backed former soviet breakaway republics refused to respect the 50-50 agreements between Iran and the Soviet Union (despite their international obligation). Russia, Azerbaijan, Kazakhstan and Turkmenistan continue to claim territorial waters thus regarding the Caspian Sea as open international body of water, dismissing its geographically lake nature.

See also

Armenian Highlands
Caspian Hyrcanian mixed forests
Caspian Sea
Elburz Range forest steppe
International rankings of Iran
List of castles in Iran
List of caves in Iran
List of earthquakes in Iran
List of Iranian four-thousanders
Provinces of Iran
Counties of Iran
List of cities in Iran by province
List of largest cities of Iran
Ramsar, Mazandaran: Highest natural radioactivity in the world
Strait of Hormuz

Notes

References

External links

Geography of Persia, Encyclopædia Iranica:
 i. Evolution of geographical knowledge.
 ii. Human geography.
 iii. Political geography.
 iv. Cartography of Persia.
Iran in Maps – BBC (population, land, infrastructure)
Iran Geography
 Flora of Iran by Pr Ahmad GHAHREMAN
Persia (Iran), Afghanistan and Baluchistan is a map from 1897